"You'll Never Walk Alone" is a show tune from the 1945 Rodgers and Hammerstein musical Carousel. In the second act of the musical, Nettie Fowler, the cousin of the protagonist Julie Jordan, sings "You'll Never Walk Alone" to comfort and encourage Julie when her husband, Billy Bigelow, the male lead, stabs himself with a knife whilst trying to run away after attempting a robbery with his mate Jigger and dies in her arms. The song is reprised in the final scene to encourage a graduation class of which Louise (Billy and Julie's daughter) is a member. The now invisible Billy, who has been granted the chance to return to Earth for one day in order to redeem himself, watches the ceremony and is able to silently motivate  Louise and Julie to join in with the song.

The song is also sung at association football clubs around the world, where it is performed by a massed chorus of supporters on match day; this tradition developed at Liverpool F.C. after the chart success of the 1963 single of the song by the local Liverpool group Gerry and the Pacemakers. In some areas of the UK and Europe, "You'll Never Walk Alone" became the anthem of support for medical staff, first responders, and those in quarantine during the COVID-19 pandemic. The composition is sometimes treated by performers as a religious song, such as with the 1967 version by Elvis Presley, which was featured on several of his gospel albums.

Background
Christine Johnson, who created the role of Nettie Fowler, introduced the song in the original Broadway production.  Later in the show Jan Clayton, as Julie Jordan, reprised it, with the chorus joining in.

In the film, it is first sung by Claramae Turner as Nettie. The weeping Julie Jordan (Shirley Jones) tries to sing it but cannot; it is later reprised by Julie and those attending the graduation.

Gerry and the Pacemakers version

In the UK, the song's most successful cover was released in 1963 by the Liverpudlian Merseybeat group Gerry and the Pacemakers, peaking at number one on the UK Singles Chart for four consecutive weeks. The band's version also reached the top of the charts in Australia, Ireland and New Zealand.

Liverpool F.C.
After becoming a chart hit by a local band, the song gained popularity on the Anfield terraces, and the song quickly became the football anthem of Liverpool F.C., which adopted "You'll Never Walk Alone" as its official motto on its coat of arms. The song is sung by its supporters moments before the start of each home game at Anfield with the Gerry and the Pacemakers version being played over the public address system. In 2013, the 50th anniversary of the song being sung on the Kop, Simon Hart of The Independent writes, 

According to former player Tommy Smith, lead vocalist Gerry Marsden presented Liverpool manager Bill Shankly with a recording of his forthcoming cover single during a pre-season coach trip in the summer of 1963. "Shanks was in awe of what he heard. ... Football writers from the local newspapers were travelling with our party and, thirsty for a story of any kind between games, filed copy back to their editors to the effect that we had adopted Gerry Marsden's forthcoming single as the club song." The squad was subsequently invited to perform the track with the band on The Ed Sullivan Show with Marsden stating, "Bill came up to me. He said, 'Gerry my son, I have given you a football team and you have given us a song'."

Shankly picked the song as his eighth and final selection for the BBC's Desert Island Discs on the eve of the 1965 FA Cup Final. As Liverpool fans sang "You'll Never Walk Alone" at Wembley during the 1965 FA Cup Final win over Leeds, commentator Kenneth Wolstenholme referred to it as "Liverpool's signature tune". Marsden told BBC Radio how, in the 1960s, the disc jockey at Anfield would play the top 10 commercial records in descending order, with the number one single played last, shortly before kickoff. Liverpool fans on the Kop would sing along, but unlike with other hit singles, once "You'll Never Walk Alone" dropped out of the top 10, instead of disregarding the song, supporters continued to sing it. In retirement, as his granddaughter Karen Gill recollects, Shankly would get out the gramophone and "put the record on and play it, so we would hear it in the house."

In his commentary on the memorial service following the Hillsborough disaster in 1989, Peter Jones recited the lyrics, which were then sung by a cathedral choir. Aretha Franklin's recording of the song was played by BBC Radio 1 DJ and Liverpool fan John Peel in his first show following the disaster, when he became too upset to carry on broadcasting for a period. In 2019, during a Take That concert at Anfield, lead singer and Liverpool fan Gary Barlow brought out a guest vocalist, Gerry Marsden – who had come out of retirement for the performance – and they sang the club's anthem "You'll Never Walk Alone".

In 1995, the Gerry and the Pacemakers version peaked at number 34 on the Dutch Single Top 100 on the week ending March 18 and number 24 on the Dutch Top 40 on the week ending April 1. It re-entered the Irish Singles Chart in 2012, peaking at number four on the week ending 20 September.

Other teams

In 1958, members of an operatic society performed the song as a tribute to the Busby Babes in the first home match of Manchester United at Old Trafford after the Munich air disaster, and fans in the stadium joined in the singing.

The song was adopted by Scottish team Celtic after a 1966 Cup Winners' Cup semi-final against Liverpool at Anfield, and is now sung by Celtic fans prior to every home European tie, and later by Germany's Borussia Dortmund, which Liverpool went on to play in the cup final. When Celtic and Liverpool played in the quarterfinals of the 2002-03 UEFA Cup, Gerry Marsden performed the song at Celtic Park before both teams took the field and both sets of fans sang along.

The song has also been adopted by Dutch team FC Twente after it was officially given to them by the Anfield stadium speaker George Sephton during the last game in the Diekman stadium, before moving to the new Arke Stadion. Today, Twente fans sing the song before every home game. Elsewhere in the Netherlands, Feyenoord and SC Cambuur have adopted the song as well, with Feyenoord using the Lee Towers version.

Additional football teams which now use the song include 1. FSV Mainz 05, TSV 1860 Munich, Austria's FC Admira Wacker, Belgium's Club Brugge KV and KV Mechelen, Japan's FC Tokyo, Spain's CD Lugo, and Greece's ARIS. In ice hockey, the song has been adopted by German Deutsche Eishockey Liga side Krefeld Pinguine and Croatian Medveščak Zagreb.

A special recording of the song was made in solidarity with Bradford City following the Valley Parade fire in 1985, when 56 spectators died and many more were seriously injured. The song was performed by The Crowd, which was a supergroup featuring Gerry Marsden, Paul McCartney and others, and spent two weeks at number one in the UK.

Some years later, after witnessing a rendition of "You'll Never Walk Alone" at Anfield in 2007, the President of the Spanish Olympic Committee, Alejandro Blanco, said he felt inspired to seek lyrics to his country's wordless national anthem, the Marcha Real, ahead of Madrid's bid to host the 2016 Olympic Games.

During the 2014 Hong Kong protests, legislator Tam Yiu Chung quoted the song during a Legislative Council of Hong Kong meeting, to salute the Hong Kong Police, who had received widespread criticism for using excessive force against pro-democracy protesters. More than 2,000 Liverpool Football Club fans in Hong Kong condemned his inappropriate use of the song, comparing his support of the police action to the police actions in the 1989 Hillsborough disaster, where South Yorkshire Police were found to have distorted facts relating to the unlawful killing by negligence of 96 Liverpool supporters.

On 13 March 2016, after Borussia Dortmund's 2–0 win against 1. FSV Mainz 05 in the German Bundesliga, supporters of both teams performed the song to commemorate a Dortmund fan who died from a cardiac arrest in the stands during the game.

Chart history

Weekly charts
Gerry & The Pacemakers

Patti LaBelle & The Bluebells

The Lettermen

Elvis Presley

Brooklyn Bridge

Blue Haze

The Crowd

Year-end charts

Marcus Mumford version

Marcus Mumford, lead singer of the British folk rock band Mumford & Sons, released a cover version of "You'll Never Walk Alone" as a single on 20 March 2020 through Glassnote Records. Mumford's version was originally recorded for the Apple TV+ sports comedy-drama Ted Lasso; it appears in the first-season finale, "The Hope That Kills You."

Background
All proceeds from the song will be donated to the Grenfell Foundation and War Child UK. On his Instagram account, Mumford explained the idea behind releasing the song and revealing the charities that would benefit from sales of the song, "It felt like we could get something out in the world that would benefit both of those organisations." The song was in the works prior to the announcement of the global coronavirus pandemic and was originally slated to air on a TV show in production, but "for lots of reasons we wanted it just to be out in the world sooner rather than later, so here it is", the singer shared on his YouTube account.

Live performances
On 1 April 2020, Mumford performed the song from his home on American late-night talk show The Tonight Show Starring Jimmy Fallon. The video was shot by his wife, Carey Mulligan. He stated why he released the song earlier than planned, "This is a cover of 'You'll Never Walk Alone', which I had recorded in January for Jason Sudeikis, who I know well. I recorded it because I did the music for his TV show and we spoke and felt like it was appropriate to try and get it out sooner. We put it for two charities that are really close to my heart, War Child UK and the Grenfell Foundation, and also just to accompany people who might like it through a pretty weird time."

Charts

Michael Ball & Captain Tom Moore version

In April 2020, to mark 99-year old Captain Tom Moore completing the first phase of his fundraising walk during the COVID-19 pandemic, English actor, singer and broadcaster, Michael Ball sang "You'll Never Walk Alone" for him live on BBC Breakfast. Ball said: "It's an extraordinary achievement. I've been trying to think of a song which encapsulates your achievement and what you have done for us." Within 24 hours, the performance was recorded, and made into a digital single featuring the NHS Voices of Care Choir, and Moore's spoken words. It was released by Decca Records on 17 April, with all proceeds going to NHS Charities Together. The duo appeared on Zoe Ball's Radio 2 show, where they both performed the song.

Commercial performance
On 19 April 2020, the song went straight to number one in the United Kingdom's "The Official Big Top 40" chart, selling almost 36,000 copies in its first 48 hours. On 21 April 2020 the song was the "biggest trending song" as measured by the Official Charts Company. On 24 April 2020, the song entered the UK Singles Chart at number one, with combined chart sales of 82,000 making it the fastest-selling single of 2020 so far and making Moore – six days short of his one hundredth birthday – the oldest person to achieve that position and meaning that he was at number one on his 100th birthday, beating the previous record-holder Tom Jones, who was 68 years old when a Comic Relief rendition of "Islands in the Stream" reached number one in 2009.

Charts

References

External links
 

1945 songs
1964 singles
1985 singles
2020 singles
Andy Williams songs
Barbra Streisand songs
Celtic F.C. songs
Charity singles
Columbia Graphophone Company singles
COVID-19 pandemic in the United Kingdom
Decca Records singles
Feyenoord songs
Football songs and chants
Glassnote Records singles
Gerry and the Pacemakers songs
Glen Campbell songs
Irish Singles Chart number-one singles
Jane Morgan songs
Johnny Preston songs
Labelle songs
Lana Del Rey songs
Liverpool F.C. songs
Laurie Records singles
Mahalia Jackson songs
Marcus Mumford songs
Michael Ball songs
Number-one singles in Australia
Number-one singles in New Zealand
Number-one singles in Scotland
Protest songs
Roy Hamilton songs
Shirley Jones songs
Song recordings produced by George Martin
Songs about friendship
Songs from Rodgers and Hammerstein musicals
Songs with lyrics by Oscar Hammerstein II
Songs with music by Richard Rodgers
UK Independent Singles Chart number-one singles
UK Singles Chart number-one singles